Oochoristica is a genus of tapeworms.

Species

 Oochoristica acapulcoensis Brooks, Pérez-Ponce de León & García-Prieto, 1999
 Oochoristica aizawlensis Banerjee, Manna & Sanyal, 2016
 Oochoristica ameivae (Beddard, 1914)
 Oochoristica americana Harwood, 1932
 Oochoristica anniellae Stunkard & Lynch, 1944
 Oochoristica anolis Harwood, 1932
 Oochoristica aulicus Johri, 1961
 Oochorsitica australiensis Spasskii, 1951
 Oochoristica bailea Singal, 1961
 Oochorsitica beveridgei Masova et al., 2010
 Oochoristica bezyi Bursey & Goldberg, 1992
 Oochoristica bivitellobata Loewen, 1940
 Oochoristica bivitellobatoides Bursey & Goldberg, 2011
 Oochoristica brachysoma Dupouy & Kechemir, 1973
 Oochoristica bresslaui Fuhrmann, 1927
 Oochoristica calotes Nama & Khichi, 1974
 Oochoristica celebensis Yamaguti, 1954
 Oochoristica chabaudi Dollfus, 1954
 Oochoristica chalcidesi Schuster, 2011
 Oochoristica chavenoni Capron, Brygoo, & Broussert, 1962
 Oochoristica chinensis Jensen, Schmidt & Kuntz, 1983
 Oochoristica courduieri Capron, Brygoo, & Broussert, 1962
 Oochoristica crassiceps Baylis, 1920
 Oochoristica crotalicola Alexander & Alexander, 1957
 Oochoristica crotaphyti McAllister & Trauth, 1985
 Oochoristica cryptobothrium Linstow, 1906
 Oochoristica danielae Capron, Brygoo, & Broussert, 1962
 Oochoristica darensis Dollfus, 1957
 Oochoristica elaphis Harwood, 1932
 Oochoristica elongata Dupouy & Kechemir, 1973
 Oochoristica eremophila Beveridge, 1977
 Oochoristica eumecis Harwood, 1932
 Oochoristica feliui Foronda, Nbreu-Acosta, Casanova, Ribas & Valladares, 2009
 Oochoristica freitasi Rêgo & Ibáñez, 1965
 Oochoristica gallica Dollfus, 1954
 Oochoristica gracewileyae Loewen, 1940
 Oochoristica guanacastensis Brooks, Pérez-Ponce de León & García-Prieto, 1999
 Oochoristica gymnophthalmicola Bursey, Goldberg & Telford, 2007
 Oochoristica hainanensis Hsu, 1935
 Oochoristica harschi McAllister & Bursey, 2017
 Oochoristica hemidactyli Johri, 1955
 Oochoristica iguanae Bursey & Goldberg, 1996
 Oochoristica indica Misra, 1945
 Oochoristica insulamargaritae López-Neyra & Diaz-Ungría, 1957
 Oochoristica islandensis Bursey & Goldberg, 1992
 Oochoristica japonensis Kugi, 1993
 Oochoristica javaensis Kennedy, Killick, & Beverley-Burton, 1982
 Oochoristica jodhpurensis Nama, 1987
 Oochoristica jonnesi Bursey, McAllister & Freed, 1997
 Oochoristica junkea Johri, 1950
 Oochoristica khalili Hamid, 1932
 Oochoristica koubeki Mašová, Tenora & Baruš, 2012
 Oochoristica langrangei Joyeux & Houdemer, 1927
 Oochoristica leiperi (Wahid, 1961)
 Oochoristica leonregagnonae Arizmendi-Espinosa, García-Prieto & Guillén-Hernández, 2005
 Oochoristica lizardi Misra, Capoor & Singh, 1989
 Oochoristica longicirrata Dupouy & Kechemir, 1973
 Oochoristica lygosomae Burt, 1933
 Oochoristica lygosomatis Skinker, 1935
 Oochoristica macallisteri Bursey & Goldberg, 1996
 Oochoristica maccoyi Bursey & Goldberg, 1996
 Oochoristica mandapamensis Johri, 1958
 Oochoristica microscolex Della Santa, 1956
 Oochoristica najdei Magzoub et al., 1980
 Oochoristica natricis Harwood, 1932
 Oochoristica noronhae Bursey, Rocha, Menezes, Ariani & Vrcibradic, 2010
 Oochoristica novaezealandae Schmidt & Allison, 1985
 Oochoristica nupta Kugi & Mohammad, 1988
 Oochoristica okinawensis Kugi, 1993
 Oochoristica ophia Capoor, Srivastava, & Chahuan, 1974
 Oochoristica osheroffi Meggitt, 1934
 Oochoristica parvogenitalis Dupouy & Kechemir, 1973
 Oochoristica parvovaria Steelman, 1939
 Oochoristica parvula (Stunkard, 1938)
 Oochoristica pauriensis Malhotra & Capoor, 1984
 Oochoristica phrynocephali Schuster, 2012
 Oochoristica phrynosomatis (Harwood, 1932)
 Oochoristica piankai Bursey & Woolery, 1996
 Oochoristica pleionorches Dollfus, 1954
 Oochoristica pseudocotylea Dollfus, 1957
 Oochoristica rostellata Zschokke, 1905
 Oochoristica salensis Dollfus, 1954
 Oochoristica scelopori Voge & Fox, 1950
 Oochoristica sindensis Farooq et al.,1983
 Oochoristica sobolevi Spasskii, 1948
 Oochoristica tandani Singh, 1957
 Oochoristica thapari Johri, 1934
 Oochoristica theileri Fuhrmann, 1924
 Oochoristica trachysauri (Mac Callum, 1921)
 Oochoristica travassosi Rêgo & Ibáñez, 1965
 Oochoristica truncata (Krabbe, 1879)
 Oochoristica tuberculata (Rudolphi, 1819)
 Oochoristica ubelakeri Bursey et al., 1994
 Oochoristica vacuolata Hickman, 1954
 Oochoristica vanzolinii Rêgo & Oliveira-Rodrigues, 1965
 Oochoristica varani Nama & Khichi, 1972
 Oochoristica whitentoni Steelman, 1939
 Oochoristica whitfieldi Guillén-Hernández, García-Prieto & Arizmendi-Espinosa, 2007
 Oochoristica zonuri Baylis, 1919

References

Cestoda genera